The Christian Democratic Party (PDC), also called simply Christian Democracy (DC), is a Christian democrat political party in Argentina.

History
In 1947 the Christian Democrat Organization of America was founded to advocate the principles of Christian Democracy in their respective countries. Each of the member parties is different, sometimes having differing views of Christian Democracy itself. Some of the member parties are in government in their country, others are in coalition government, and others are not in government.

When President Perón was reelected in 1952, the government's relationship with the Catholic Church also worsened. As Perón increasingly distanced itself from the Church, the government, which had first respected the Church's privileges, now took them away in a distinctly confrontational fashion. By 1954, the Peronist was openly anti-Church. Meanwhile, a Christian Democratic Party was founded in 1954 after several other organisations had been active promoting Christian democracy in Argentina.

The Party was founded in 1954 after several other organisations had been active promoting Christian democracy in Argentina. Leading activists in its early years included Manuel Vicente Ordonez, Lucas Ayarragaray h., José Allende and Horacio Sueldo.

In 1973 the Party split, with Allende's Popular Christian Party being part of the Peronist Frejuli front which brought Héctor José Cámpora to power, opposed by Sueldo's Revolutionary Christian Party which worked with the Intransigent Party and joined the left-wing Popular Revolutionary Alliance.

After the return of democracy in 1983, the Christian Democratic Party was reunited. In 1989, the Party formed an alliance with the Justicialist Party to support the presidential bid of Carlos Menem. Shortly after Menem won the election, the PDC left the coalition, but not before the strategy had provoked a split in its ranks. The PDC's leader, Carlos Auyero, and his followers in the 'Humanism and Liberation' grouping left the Party to help form what would become the Broad Front with Carlos Álvarez and other dissident Peronists.

The party was part of the centre-left FrePaSo coalition formed by the Broad Front in the 1990s and entered government in 1999 as part of the Alianza between FrePaSo and the Radical Civic Union that brought Fernando de la Rúa to the presidency. The Alianza collapsed in 2001 and FrePaSo effectively disappeared.

After 2003, the Party backed the Presidency of Néstor Kirchner and joined the Plural Consensus in support of his Front for Victory. In 2007 The Party backed the election of Cristina Fernández de Kirchner as President.

In 2011, however, the Party changed affiliation and supported opposition candidate Eduardo Duhalde.

Actuality

José Manuel de la Sota, ex-governor of Córdoba Province, was the candidate of the Christian Democratic Party in the 2015 presidential election in part of the United for a New Alternative political coalition.

In 2015 Juan Fernando Brügge was elected to the Chamber of Deputies for his province, representing the centrist Christian Democratic Party, part of the United for a New Alternative political coalition.

See also
 Christian democracy
 Catholic social teaching
 Christianity and politics
 List of Christian democratic parties around the world

Literature
 
 
 Kalyvas, Stathis N. and Kees van Kersbergen (2010). "Christian Democracy". Annual Review of Political Science 2010. 13:183–209.

External links
 Christian Democratic Party of Autonomous City of Buenos Aires Official blog
 Christian Democratic Party of Catamarca Province Official blog
 Christian Democratic Party of Córdoba Province Official blog
 Christian Democratic Party of Corrientes Province Official blog
 Christian Democratic Party of Santa Fe Province Official blog 
 Christian Democratic Party of Tucumán Province Official blog
 Juventud Demócrata Cristiana de Argentina Official blog
 Instituto Argentino 'Jacques Maritain' Official blog

References

1954 establishments in Argentina
Catholic political parties
Christian democratic parties in Argentina
Political parties established in 1954